For people with the surname, see Sancton (surname).

Sancton is a village and civil parish in the East Riding of Yorkshire, England.

The civil parish is formed by the village of Sancton and the hamlet of Houghton. According to the 2011 UK census, Sancton parish had a population of 286, a reduction of one on the 2001 UK census figure.

The church dedicated to All Saints was designated a Grade II* listed building in 1967 and is now recorded in the National Heritage List for England, maintained by Historic England.

Sancton found that a horse's 'cart/carriage' was found in one of the surrounding fields.
To be seen in London's History museum.

Places of interest 
For places of interest in Sancton, see Market Weighton and North Newbald.

References

External links

Villages in the East Riding of Yorkshire
Civil parishes in the East Riding of Yorkshire